The English Football League play-offs for the 2020–21 season (referred to as the Sky Bet Play-Offs for sponsorship reasons) were held in May 2021, with all finals played at Wembley Stadium in London. The play-offs begin in each league with two semi-finals played over two legs. The teams who finished in 3rd, 4th, 5th, and 6th place in the Championship and League One and the 4th, 5th, 6th, and 7th-placed teams in League Two are set to compete. The winners of the semi-finals advance to the finals, with the winner of the final gaining promotion for the following season.

The away goals rule does not apply in the playoff semi-finals per the standard rules.

Background 
The English Football League play-offs have been held every year since 1987. They take place for each division following the conclusion of the regular season and are contested by the four clubs finishing below the automatic promotion places. The fixtures are determined by final league position – in the Championship and League One this is 3rd v 6th and 4th v 5th, while in League Two it is 4th v 7th and 5th v 6th.

Championship

Qualified teams

First leg

Second leg

Brentford won 3–2 on aggregate.

Swansea City won 2–1 on aggregate.

Championship final

League One 

First leg
 

Second leg

Blackpool won 6–3 on aggregate.

Lincoln City won 3–2 on aggregate.

Final

League Two 

First leg
 

Second leg
Morecambe won 3–2 on aggregate.
Newport County won 5–4 on aggregate.

Final

References

 
Play-offs
English Football League play-offs